Scottish Mussel is a 2015 comedy film, written, directed and produced by Talulah Riley that revolves around the life of a Glaswegian criminal, Ritchie (Martin Compston), who becomes interested in poaching freshwater pearl mussels from rivers in the Highlands of Scotland. During the course of his criminal enterprise, he falls in love with Beth, played by Riley, who is a conservationist from England.

Synopsis
Beth is an upper-class conservationist who is in Scotland to protect the freshwater pearl mussel from poachers who prise open the mussels and kill them for the pearls inside. Ritchie falls in love with Beth when he sees her emerging from a river in a bikini. Thereafter, he finds it harder to engage in illegal pearl poaching and slowly starts to learn all the wildlife in the area to get closer to Beth. Against this, they must fight off Glaswegian criminals and Ukrainian gangsters.

Cast
Martin Compston as Ritchie
Talulah Riley as Beth
Morgan Watkins as Ethan
Joe Thomas as Danny
Paul Brannigan as Fraser
Emun Elliott as Leon
James Dreyfus as the headmaster
Rachael Stirling as Miss Pringle
Marianna Palka as Fiona
Camille Coduri as Aunt Nettie
Stephen O'Donnell as Gavin
Neil Greig Fulton as Murray
Ryan Gage as Ramsey
Rufus Hound as PC Dougie
Russell Kane as Sinclair
Harry Enfield as Bill

Production
The film is set in the Scottish Highlands region, but most of the production was filmed in and around Dunoon, in Argyll and Bute, with some scenes filmed in Glasgow.

Critical reception
Almost all reviews were negative about the film; James Luxford, writing in the Radio Times said: "All the jokes miss the mark as well even though, surrounding the couple, are familiar faces in comedy including Harry Enfield and Russell Kane. Mostly, the supporting cast do horrendous accents and contribute little to the plot. Listless from start to end, there is nothing to be salvaged from this dreadful Highland fling." Similarly, David Kettle said: "What Riley seems to be aiming for is a Pride- or even Brassed Off-style feelgood UK romcom-with-a-message. But with its broad, scattergun humour, lazy characterisation and inept plot and dialogue (not to mention its patronising, metropolitan view of "wild" Scotland), Scottish Mussel should have stayed firmly locked in its shell."

Robert Peacock, writing for the Wee Review, said: "Cliché-heavy conservationist comedy seeks to emulate feel good British films of yesteryear. Fails."

See also
Cinema of Scotland

References

External links
 
 

Films set in Scotland
Films shot in Scotland
Scottish films
2015 in Scotland
2015 comedy-drama films
Films shot in Argyll and Bute
Scottish comedy films
2015 comedy films
English-language Scottish films
2010s English-language films
2010s British films